The following is a list of image resolutions implemented in the image sensors used in various digital cameras.

{| class="wikitable sortable"
|-
! Width (px)
! Height (px)
! Aspect ratio
! Actual pixel count
! Megapixels
! Camera examples
|-
| 32
| 32
|1:1
| 1024
| 0.001
| Cromemco Cyclops (1975)
|-
| 100
| 100
|1:1
| 10,000
| 0.01
| Kodak Prototype by Steven Sasson (1975)
|-
| 640
| 480
| 
| 307,200
| 0.3
| Apple QuickTake 100 (1994)
|-
| 832
| 608
| 
| 505,856
| 0.5
| Canon Powershot 600 (1996)
|-
| 1,024
| 768
| 
| 786,432
| 0.8
| Olympus D-300L (1996)
|-
| 1024
| 1024
|1:1
| 1,048,576
| 1.0
| Nikon NASA F4 (1991)
|-
| 1,280
| 960
| 
| 1,228,800
| 1.3
| Fujifilm DS-300 (1997)
|-
| 1,280
| 1,024
|5:4
| 1,310,720
| 1.3
| Fujifilm MX-700, Fujifilm MX-1700 (1999), Leica Digilux (1998), Leica Digilux Zoom (2000)
|-
| 1,600
| 1,200
| 
| 1,920,000
| 2
| Nikon Coolpix 950, Samsung GT-S3500
|-
| 1,600
| 1,280
|5:4
| 2,048,000
| 2
| Pentax EI2000/Hewlett Packard 912
|-
| 2,012
| 1,324
| 
| 2,663,888
| 2.74
| Nikon D1
|-
| 2,048
| 1,536
| 
| 3,145,728
| 3
| Canon PowerShot A75, Nikon Coolpix 995
|-
| 2,160
| 1,440
| 
| 3,110,400
| 3.11
| Canon EOS D30
|-
| 2,272
| 1,704
| 
| 3,871,488
| 4
| Olympus Stylus 410, Contax i4R (although CCD is actually square 2,272×2,272)
|-
| 2,464
| 1,648
| 
| 4,060,672
| 4.1
| Canon 1D
|-
| 2,560
| 1,920
| 
| 4,915,200
| 5
| Olympus E-1, Sony Cyber-shot DSC-F707, Sony Cyber-shot DSC-F717
|-
| 2,816
| 2,112
| 
| 5,947,392
| 5.9
| Olympus Stylus 600 Digital
|-
| 3,008
| 2,000
| 
| 6,016,000
| 6
| D100, Nikon D40, D50, D70, D70s, Pentax K100D, Konica Minolta Maxxum 7D, Konica Minolta Maxxum 5D, Epson R-D1
|-
| 3,072
| 2,048
| 
| 6,291,456
| 6.3
| Canon EOS 10D, Canon EOS 300D
|-
| 3,072
| 2,304
| 
| 7,077,888
| 7
| Olympus FE-210, Canon PowerShot A620
|-
| 3,456
| 2,304
| 
| 7,962,624
| 8
| Canon EOS 350D
|-
| 3,264
| 2,448
| 
| 7,990,272
| 8
| Olympus E-500, Olympus SP-350, Canon PowerShot A720 IS, Nokia 701, HTC Desire HD, Apple iPhone 4S
|-
| 3,504
| 2,336
| 
| 8,185,344
| 8.2
| Canon EOS 30D, Canon EOS-1D Mark II, Canon EOS-1D Mark II N
|-
| 3,520
| 2,344
| 
| 8,250,880
| 8.25
| Canon EOS 20D
|-
| 3,648
| 2,736
| 
| 9,980,928
| 10
| Canon PowerShot G11, Canon PowerShot G12, Canon PowerShot S90, Canon PowerShot S95, Nikon CoolPix P7000, Nikon CoolPix P7100, Olympus E-410, Olympus E-510, Panasonic FZ50, Fujifilm FinePix HS10, Samsung EX1
|-
| 3,872
| 2,592
| 
| 10,036,224
| 10
| Nikon D40x, Nikon D60, Nikon D3000, Nikon D200, Nikon D80, Pentax K10D, Pentax K200D, Sony DSLR-A100
|-
| 3,888
| 2,592
| 
| 10,077,696
| 10.1
| Canon EOS 40D, Canon EOS 400D, Canon EOS 1000D
|-
| 4,064
| 2,704
| 
| 10,989,056
| 11
| Canon EOS-1Ds
|-
| 4,000
| 3,000
| 
| 12,000,000
| 12
| Canon Powershot G9, Fujifilm FinePix S200EXR, Nikon Coolpix L110, Kodak Easyshare Max Z990
|-
| 4,256
| 2,832
| 
| 12,052,992
| 12.1
| Nikon D3, Nikon D3S, Nikon D700, Fujifilm FinePix S5 Pro
|-
| 4,272
| 2,848
| 
| 12,166,656
| 12.2
| Canon EOS 450D
|-
| 4,032
| 3,024
| 
| 12,192,768
| 12.2
| Olympus PEN E-P1
|-
| 4,288
| 2,848
| 
| 12,212,224
| 12.2
| Nikon D2Xs/D2X, Nikon D300, Nikon D300S, Nikon D90, Nikon D5000, Pentax K-x
|-
| 4,900
| 2,580
| 
| 12,642,000
| 12.6
| RED ONE Mysterium
|-
| 4,368
| 2,912
| 
| 12,719,616
| 12.7
| Canon EOS 5D
|-
| 5,120
| 2,700
| 
| 13,824,000
| 13.8
| RED Mysterium-X
|-
| 7,920 (2,640 × 3)
| 1,760
| 
| 13,939,200
| 13.9
| Sigma SD14, Sigma DP1 (3 layers of pixels, 4.7 MP per layer, in Foveon X3 sensor)
|-
| 4,672
| 3,104
| 
| 14,501,888
| 14.5
| Pentax K20D, Pentax K-7
|-
| 4,752
| 3,168
| 
| 15,054,336
| 15.1
| Canon EOS 50D, Canon EOS 500D, Sigma SD1
|-
| 4,896
| 3,264
| 
| 15,980,544
| 16.0
| Canon EOS 1D Mark IV, Fujifilm X-Pro1, Fujifilm X-E1 (X-Trans sensor has a different pattern to a Bayer sensor)
|-
| 4,928
| 3,264
| 
| 16,075,136
| 16.1
| Nikon D7000, Nikon D5100, Pentax K-5
|-
| 4,992
| 3,328
| 
| 16,613,376
| 16.6
| Canon EOS-1Ds Mark II
|-
|4,080
|4,080
|1:1
|16,646,400
|16.6
|Hasselblad 503CWD
|-
| 5,184
| 3,456
| 
| 17,915,904
| 17.9
| Canon EOS 1D X, Canon EOS 7D, Canon EOS 60D, Canon EOS 100D, Canon EOS 550D, Canon EOS 600D, Canon EOS 650D, Canon EOS 700D
|-
| 4,928
| 3,696
| 
| 18,200,000
| 18.2
| Sony DSC-HX20
|-
| 5,270
| 3,516
| 
| 18,529,320
| 18.5
| Leica M9, RED Dragon
|-
| 5,472
| 3,648
| 
| 19,961,856
| 19.9
| Canon EOS-1D X Mark II, Canon EOS 6D, Canon EOS 7D Mark II, Canon EOS 70D, Canon EOS R6
|-
| 5,616
| 3,744
| 
| 21,026,304
| 21.0
| Canon EOS-1Ds Mark III, Canon EOS-5D Mark II
|-
| 5,760
| 3,840
| 
| 22,118,400
| 22.1
| Canon EOS 5D Mark III
|-
| 6,000
| 4,000
| 
| 24,000,000
| 24
| Canon EOS 80D, Canon EOS 750D, Canon EOS 760D, Nikon D5300, Nikon D5500
|-
| 6,000
| 4,000
| 
| 24,000,000
| 24.3
| Sony α5100*, Sony α6000*, Sony α6300*, Sony α6500 *, Sony α7*, Sony α7 II*, Sony α9*, Sony Alpha 99 (* The pixel number of 6,000x4,000 ist the number of "effective pixels". The sensor usually has a few extra rows of pixels on all four sides, which explains the sensor resolution of 24.3 MPixels often stated, but no information about the exact image size available.)
|-
| 6,016
| 4,000
| 
| 24,064,000
| 24.1
| Nikon D3300 Canon M50
|-
| 6,048
| 4,032
| 
| 24,385,536
| 24.4
| Nikon D3X, Nikon D600,  Nikon D610, Nikon D750, Pentax K-3, Sony Cyber-shot DSC-RX1, Sony Cyber-shot DSC-RX1R, Sony α850, Sony α900, Sony α99
|-
| 6,064
| 4,040
| 
| 24,498,560
| 24.5
| Sony α7 III
|-
| 6,244
| 4,168
| 
| 26,024,992
| 26
| Fujifilm X-T3, Fujifilm X-T30, Pentax K-3 III
|-
| 5,140
| 5,140
|1:1
| 26,419,600
| 26.4
| Leica S1 (line scanner, 1997)
|-
| 6,940
| 4,640
| 
| 32,201,600
| 32.2
| Canon EOS 90D, Canon EOS M6 Mark II
|-
| 7,360
| 4,912
| 
| 36,152,320
| 36.2
| Nikon D800, Nikon D810, Pentax K-1, Sony α7R
|-
| 7,500
| 5,000
| 
| 37,500,000
| 37.5
| Leica S2
|-
| 7,212
| 5,142
| 
| 39,031,344
| 39.0
| Hasselblad H3DII-39
|-
| 7,216
| 5,412
| 
| 39,052,992
| 39.1
| Leica RCD100
|-
| 7,264
| 5,440
| 
| 39,516,160
| 39.5
| Pentax 645D
|-
| 7,320
| 5,484
| 
| 40,142,880
| 40.1
| Phase One IQ140
|-
| 7,728
| 5,368
| ~ 10:7
| 41,483,904
| 41.5
| Nokia 808 PureView
|-
| 7,952
| 5,304
| 
| 42,177,408
| 42.4
| Sony α7R II, Sony α7R III, Sony Cyber-shot DSC-RX1R II, Sony α99 II
|-
| 8,192
| 5,464
| 
| 44,761,088
| 44.8
| Canon EOS R5
|-
| 8,256
| 5,504
| 
| 45,441,024
| 45.4
| Nikon D850, Nikon Z 7
|-
| 8,176
| 6,132
| 
| 50,135,232
| 50.1
| Hasselblad H3DII-50, Hasselblad H4D-50
|-
| 8,688
| 5,792
| 
| 50,320,896
| 50.3
| Canon EOS 5DS / 
|-
| 8,256
| 6,192 
| 
| 51,121,152
| 51.1
| Pentax 645Z
|-
| 8,256
| 6,192
| 
| 51,121,152
| 51.1
| Fujifilm GFX 50S
|-
| 8,256
| 6,192
| 
| 51,121,152
| 51.1
| Fujifilm GFX 50R
|-
| 11,250
| 5,000
| 9:4
| 56,250,000
| 56.3
| Better Light 4000E-HS (scanned)
|-
| 8,956
| 6,708
| 
| 60,076,848
| 60.1
| Hasselblad H4D-60
|-
| 9,504
| 6,336
| 
| 60,217,344
| 60.2
| Sony α7R IV
|-
| 8,984
| 6,732
| 
| 60,480,288
| 60.5
| Phase One IQ160, Phase One P65+
|-
| 10,320
| 7,752
| 
| 80,000,640
| 80
| Leaf Aptus-II 12, Leaf Aptus-II 12R
|-
| 10,328
| 7,760
| 
| 80,145,280
| 80.1
| Phase One IQ180
|-
| 9,372
| 9,372
|1:1
| 87,834,384
| 87.8
| Leica RC30 (point scanner)
|-
| 11,648
| 8,736
| 
| 101,756,928
| 101.8
| Fujifilm GFX 100
|-
| 12,600
| 10,500
|6:5
| 132,300,000
| 132.3
| Phase One PowerPhase FX/FX+ (line scanner)
|-
| 18,000
| 8,000
| 9:4
| 144,000,000
| 144
| Better Light 6000-HS/6000E-HS (line scanner)
|-
| 21,250
| 7,500
| 17:6
| 159,375,000
| 159.4
| Seitz 6x17 Digital (line scanner)
|-
| 16,352*
| 12,264*
| 
| 200,540,928
| 200.5
| Hasselblad H4D-200MS (*actuated multi (6x) shot)
|-
| 18,000
| 12,000
| 
| 216,000,000
| 216
| Better Light Super 6K-HS (line scanner)
|-
| 24,000
| 15,990
| ~ 
| 383,760,000
| 383.8
| Better Light Super 8K-HS (line scanner)
|-
| 30,600
| 13,600
| 9:4
| 416,160,000
| 416.2
| Better Light Super 10K-HS (line scanner)
|-
| 62,830
| 7,500
| ~ 25:3
| 471,225,000
| 471.2
| Seitz Roundshot D3 (80 mm lens) (scanned)
|-
| 62,830
| 13,500
| ~ 5:1
| 848,205,000
| 848.2
| Seitz Roundshot D3 (110 mm lens) (line scanner)
|-
| 38,000
| 38,000
|1:1
| 1,444,000,000
| 1,444
| Pan-STARRS PS1
|-
| 157,000
| 18,000
| ~ 26:3
| 2,826,000,000
| 2,826
| Better Light 300 mm lens Digital (line scanner)
|-
|}

See also
 Image sensor format — the sizes and shapes of common image sensors
 Exmor - the exact sizes of Sony Exmor sensors, often mentioning the camera(s) using them. Sony sells some of theses sensors to other camera manufacturers.

References

Photography equipment
MOSFETs